Death of Jean Baptiste Leschenault de la Tour
Death of Gustaf von Paykull
Death of Johann Baptist von Spix
Christian Ludwig Nitzsch publishes  Anatomie der Vögel  (Bird Anatomy) in Meckels Archiv für Anatomie und Physiologie
Eduard Friedrich Poeppig begins scientific exploration throughout Chile, Peru and Brazil.
Eduard Rüppell's "Atlas of Rüppell's Travels in Northern Africa" (1826–30) includes an ornithological section by Philipp Jakob Cretzschmar describing around thirty new species, including Meyer's parrot, Nubian bustard, goliath heron, streaked scrub warbler and Cretzschmar's bunting.
Charles Payraudeau describes Audouin's gull discovered on an expedition to Corsica

Expeditions
1826-1829  Voyage of  L'Astrolabe (French)  to the Coast of Australia, New Zealand, Fiji and Loyalty Islands. Captain Jules Dumont d'Urville  (1790–1842), Surgeon Naturalists  Joseph Paul Gaimard (1796–1858)  and  Jean René Constant Quoy (1790–1869), Pharmacian-botanist : Pierre Adolphe Lesson (1805–1888).
1826-1829  Circumnavigation by the Seniavine Captain Fiodor Litke  (1797–1882), Surgeon Naturalist Franz Carl Mertens (1764–1831), Naturalist Heinrich von Kittlitz (1799–1874), Mineralogist Alexander Postels.
Paul-Émile Botta selected to be the naturalist on a voyage around the world on Le Heros under Captain Auguste Bernard Duhaut-Cilly (1790–1849)

Ongoing events
Coenraad Jacob Temminck  Nouveau recueil de planches coloriées d'oiseaux Birds first described in this work in 1826 include the white-throated nightjar, the checker-throated woodpecker, the great-billed kingfisher, the spectacled monarch, the Cuban green woodpecker  and the Sunda thrush

Birding and ornithology by year
1826 in science